A muleskinner or mule skinner is a muleteer or mule-driver. The word may also refer to:

 Muleskinner, the mascot of St. John's Military School, Kansas, U.S.
 Muleskinner, an alternate title for the album Jack Takes the Floor by Ramblin' Jack Elliott
 Muleskinner (album), the eponymous debut album by the bluegrass band Muleskinner
 Muleskinner (band), a bluegrass band
 Mule Skinner Blues, a song